Vivian Potts [Doc] (January 1869 – August 18, 1934) was a Major League Baseball catcher who played in one game for the Washington Senators of the National League on October 3, 1892. He later played in the Pennsylvania State League from 1892–1894; the Southern Association and the South New Jersey League in 1895, and the New England League in 1896. Sometimes he is credited as Dan Potts.

External links

1869 births
1934 deaths
People from Bristol, Pennsylvania
Major League Baseball catchers
Washington Senators (1891–1899) players
19th-century baseball players
Baseball players from Pennsylvania
Allentown-Bethlehem Colts players
Allentown Colts players
Pottsville Colts players
Chattanooga Warriors players
Mobile Bluebirds players
Pawtucket Phenoms players
Sportspeople from Bucks County, Pennsylvania